Tobias Wunganayi Chiginya (5 March 1935 in Hama, Zimbabwe – 1987) was a Zimbabwean clergyman and bishop for the Roman Catholic Diocese of Gweru. He became ordained in 1966. He was appointed bishop in 1977. He died in 1987.

References

20th-century Roman Catholic bishops in Zimbabwe
1935 births
1987 deaths
Roman Catholic bishops of Gweru